The Nostrand Avenue station is an elevated station on the Long Island Rail Road's Atlantic Branch in the Bedford–Stuyvesant neighborhood of Brooklyn, New York City. Trains leave every 12–15 minutes during peak hours and 30 minutes during off-peak hours until 11 p.m.

Despite being a commuter rail stop, the station resembles a typical elevated New York City Subway station. Before the renovations began in 2018, the station featured white-on-black signage as found on the subway. They have since been replaced with black-on-white signage as seen at all other LIRR stations. Though originally built in 1877, the current elevated station was built between 1903 and 1905.

Station layout
The station has two tracks and two six-car-long side platforms above Atlantic Avenue. A street stair is at either extreme ends of both platforms. The western stairs go down to either of the eastern corners of Nostrand Avenue, while the eastern stairs go down to either of the western corners of New York Avenue. A ticket booth and two daily ticket machines are located at the Nostrand Avenue end of the eastbound platform.

Between 2018 and 2020, the station was renovated. These renovations included the installation of two elevators, one for each platform, bringing the station into compliance with the Americans with Disabilities Act of 1990. The project was completed in January 2020.

References

External links

 Nostrand Avenue entrance from Google Maps Street View
 New York Avenue entrance from Google Maps Street View
 Platforms from Google Maps Street View

Long Island Rail Road stations in New York City
Bedford–Stuyvesant, Brooklyn
Railway stations in Brooklyn
Railway stations in the United States opened in 1877
1877 establishments in New York (state)